Chiller Theatre may refer to:

Chiller Theatre (1961 TV series), a US television show airing 1961–1982 and later
Chiller Theatre (1963 TV series), a US television show airing 1963–1983
Chiller Theatre (1974 TV series), a US television show airing 1974–1978
Chiller Theatre (1984 TV series), a US television show airing 1984–2009

See also
 Chiller Thriller
 Horror host